Laynie Browne (born 1966, Los Angeles) is an American poet. Her work explores notions of silence and the invisible, through the re-contextualization of poetic forms, such as sonnets (Daily Sonnets), tales (The Scented Fox), letters (The Desires of Letters), psalms (Lost Parkour Ps(alms)) and others.

Life
Laynie Browne received her M.F.A. from Brown University in 1990. She was a member of the Subtext collective, Seattle, and The Ear Inn in New York City.

Browne has worked as an arts educator in public K–12 schools, with a focus on poetry. She has taught at University of Washington, Mills College,  and at the Poetry Center at the University of Arizona. Currently, she is a professor of creative writing at the University of Pennsylvania. Browne also serves as a mentor in the Afghan Women's Writing Project.

Her work has appeared in The Norton Anthology of Postmodern American Poetry, Conjunctions, Fence, Monkey Puzzle, Ecopoetry: A Contemporary American Anthology, Poet’s Choice. She is co-editor of I’ll Drown My Book: Conceptual Writing by Women (Les Figues Press, 2012) and is currently editing an anthology of original essays on the Poet's Novel. Browne's other current project, You Envelop Me, utilizes the elegy to investigate birth and loss within the context of the mourning process. “Attempts to illuminate once-hidden meanings are points of perforation, punctures in the fabric of writing,” says Browne. “I consider form as a container, lens, garment, dwelling, and means of locomotion.”

She lives in Wallingford, Pennsylvania.

Awards
 National Poetry Series (2006)
 Pew Fellowship in the Arts, Pew Center for Arts & Heritage (2014)
 Gertrude Stein Award in Innovative American Poetry (Three-time recipient)

Work
 
 
 
 
 
 
 Original Presence, Shivistan Books (2006)
 
 
 
 
 
 Lost Parkour Ps(alms). Presses Universitaires de Rouen. 2014. . (Available in English and French)

chapbooks

Novels
 Acts of Levitation, a novel (2002, Spuyten Duyvil)

References

External links
Laynie Browne on PennSound
Laynie Browne's profile on The Poetry Foundation
 Laynie Browne's poem "Dear She" in  Gulf Coast: A Journal of Literature and Fine Arts (25.1).
 Series of essays and interviews on the poet's novel for Jacket2

Living people
Poets from Arizona
Writers from Los Angeles
University of Washington faculty
Mills College faculty
University of Arizona faculty
1966 births
American women poets
Writers from Tucson, Arizona
Pew Fellows in the Arts
American women academics
Brown University alumni
21st-century American women